A constitutional referendum was planned to be held in Mali on 19 March 2023. It was initially scheduled for 9 July 2017. However, in late June it was postponed with no date set, before being revived in mid-April 2021, with a date set of 31 October 2021. Due to the 2021 Malian coup d'état it was indefinitely postponed, with plans for it to be held by 2024. However, in March 2023, the ruling junta announced the postponement of the referendum.

Constitutional changes
The amendments to the constitution would create new regions in line with a 2015 agreement with separatists in northern Mali. They would also enhance the powers of the President, allowing them to appoint one-third of the members of a newly created Senate (where representation would be based on the regions, affording more representation to the sparsely populated but extensive north), as well as the president of the Constitutional Court. Elected regional councils would also be set up in the ten regions of Mali, including the two newly created in the north. A Court of Auditors would also be created.

Campaign
The proposals to give the president greater powers sparked protests in Bamako on 2 July 2017 prior to a visit by French President Emmanuel Macron.

References

2023 in Mali
Mali
Referendums in Mali